Amarguinha is a traditional brand of Portuguese bitter almond liqueur from the Algarve region, in Portugal. The ingredients include water, sugar, alcohol, flavoring and caramel coloring. Currently, Amarguinha is produced by Destilatum, and distributed by Companhia Espirituosa.

With the slogan A amêndoa de Portugal, "The Portuguese almond," it is available in two flavours: original & lemon, the latter having been released during the summer of 2012. The original flavour has a pale yellow colour, while the lemon version is a brighter yellow, similar to the almond drupes themselves. Both are rated at 20% ABV, and are sold in 700 ml bottles.

Usage 
Amarguinha may be consumed as an aperitif, digestif or used to prepare cocktails. It is normally drunk cold or on ice; sometimes with drops of lemon juice or a lemon slice.

External links 

 Official website
 Marie Claire - "Aprenda a beber Amarguinha com limão, febre em Portugal que conquistou até Madonna" [in Portuguese]
 Notícias de Coimbra - Madonna celebra novo álbum com Amarguinha  [in Portuguese]

References 

Portuguese liqueurs
Almond dishes
Algarve
Nut liqueurs